Iolaus icipe is a butterfly in the family Lycaenidae. It is found in Cameroon and the Central African Republic.

Adults are on wing in January, February and July.

References

Butterflies described in 1998
Iolaus (butterfly)